Liao Hui (born May 1942 in Hong Kong) is the former director of the Hong Kong and Macau Affairs Office of the State Council of the People's Republic of China. Since March 2003, he has also served as the second vice chairman of the Chinese People's Political Consultative Conference (CPPCC), in charge of the affairs of the Chinese Communist Party in Hong Kong and Macau.

Biography
Liao's ancestors were from Huiyang, Guangdong. Born in Hong Kong, he is the son of Liao Chengzhi, and the grandson of Liao Zhongkai and He Xiangning.

Liao was born in Hong Kong during his father's time with the Eighth Route Army office in colony, but fled to back to China with family following the Japanese invasion in December 1941.

He was a member of every Central Committee of the Chinese Communist Party from the 12th to the 17th, and the vice chairman of the 10th and 11th sessions of the CPPCC.

Further reading
Mayumi Itoh (2012). Pioneers of Sino-Japanese Relations: Liao and Takasaki. Palgrave-MacMillan .

External links
Liao Hui's profile at xinhuanet.com

1942 births
Living people
People's Republic of China politicians from Hong Kong
Chinese Communist Party politicians
Hong Kong Basic Law Drafting Committee members
Hakka people
Hong Kong people of Hakka descent
People from Huiyang
Vice Chairpersons of the National Committee of the Chinese People's Political Consultative Conference